Borodulino is a rural locality (a settlement) in Vereshchaginsky District, Perm Krai, Russia. The population was 1,068 as of 2010. There are 22 streets.

Geography 
Borodulino is located 23 km southwest of Vereshchagino (the district's administrative centre) by road. Ageyevo is the nearest rural locality.

References 

Rural localities in Vereshchaginsky District